National Road 9 a route belonging to the Polish national roads network. It runs from Radom, to Rzeszów. The route is part of the international European route E371. In Radom the road shares a part with the National Road 12, and in Opatów with the National Road 74. It is the only one-digit numbered national road for which there are no plans to build an expressway or motorway.

Important settlements along the National Road 9 
 Radom
 Skaryszew
 Iłża
 Ostrowiec Świętokrzyski
 Opatów
 Klimontów
 Łoniów
 Tarnobrzeg
 Nowa Dęba
 Majdan Królewski
 Cmolas
 Kolbuszowa
 Głogów Małopolski
 Rzeszów

Route plan

References

09